Endre Ipacs is a Hungarian sprint canoer who competed in the late 1990s. He won a bronze medal in the C-2 1000 m event at the 1998 ICF Canoe Sprint World Championships in Szeged.

References

Hungarian male canoeists
Living people
Year of birth missing (living people)
ICF Canoe Sprint World Championships medalists in Canadian